The Students' Educational and Cultural Movement of Ladakh is an Indian non-governmental organisation based in Ladakh, India.

History
The Students' Educational and Cultural Movement of Ladakh (SECMOL) is an organisation founded in 1988 aimed at reforming the educational system of Ladakh,  by a group of young Ladakhis returning from university who understood the problems of the younger generation with modern education, their lack of focus and the cultural confusion. Their activities include working to reform the government school system, helping village students in their education, awakening youth to the problems stemming from inappropriate and insensitive schooling, producing related videos and radio programmes, and designing and building solar-heated eco-friendly buildings.

Phey campus
SECMOL Campus is located near the village of Phey in the Indus valley 18 km from Leh. It was developed between 1994 and 1999 and was inaugurated in 1998 by the Dalai Lama.
Built using simple, low-cost traditional techniques, the campus now comprises three residential houses, 20 small "cell rooms" and a large school building, all solar heated. Part of SECMOL's work is to develop techniques that use alternative energy sources. Ladakh has over 300 sunny days per year and the sun is therefore a reliable source of energy and an alternative to fossil fuels. The campus is home to about 70 students and a few staff and volunteers, who live, work and study there.
The campus is maintained, and to a large degree run, by the students themselves on a democratic basis.

Bibliography
 Rewriting the Books in Ladakh
 Lesson from Leh son: Meet Ladakh's man of hope

See also
 Green building
 Ice Stupa
 Ladakh
 Thinlas Chorol
 Tourism in Ladakh

References

External links

 Official website
The Times of India

Education in Ladakh
Organisations based in Jammu and Kashmir
1988 establishments in Jammu and Kashmir
Organizations established in 1988
Organisations based in Ladakh
Science and technology in Ladakh